Benjamin Plu (born July 26, 1994) is a wide receiver for the Fehérvár Enthroners in the European League of Football. He was born in Le Mans, France and was drafted as in the first round of the 2019 CFL European Draft by the BC Lions. He played College football for the McGill Redbirds football program.

Early life
Plu began playing football in his hometown for the Caïmans 72 du Mans and was selected for the French junior national team.

College career
Plu attended Le Mans University first before transferring to McGill University, where he recorded 75 receiving yards and one touchdown in six games played.

Professional career

Thonon Black Panthers
PPlu began his professional career in France with the Thonon Black Panthers, leading them to a league title and earning the championship game MVP in 2019.

BC Lions
In the 2019 CFL European Draft the BC Lions selected him in the only round with the 7th overall pick. He spent the entire 2019 season on the active roster, but didn't play in the 2020 CFL season due to the cancelled season. His contract was extended for the 2021 season but he was subsequently released in the preseason.

Seinäjoki Crocodiles
Plu signed with the Seinäjoki Crocodiles of the Finnish Vaahteraliiga in 2021. In seven games, he recorded 19 receptions for 296 yards and three touchdowns.

Barcelona Dragons
On December 17, 2021, Plu signed with the Barcelona Dragons.

Fehérvár Enthroners
On 3 December 2022, Plu signed with the Fehérvár Enthroners for the upcoming season in 2023.

References

External links
McGill University bio
CFL.ca bio

1994 births
Living people
French players of American football
American football wide receivers
McGill Redbirds football players
BC Lions players
Barcelona Dragons (ELF) players
Fehérvár Enthroners players
Expatriate players of American football
French expatriate sportspeople in Canada
French expatriate sportspeople in Spain
French expatriate sportspeople in Finland
French expatriate sportspeople in Hungary
Sportspeople from Le Mans